Brookside (2021 pop.: 1,439) is a rural community in the Canadian province of Nova Scotia, located in the Halifax Regional Municipality on the Chebucto Peninsula.

References
Explore HRM
Brookside Community Homeowners
History of Brookside - Prospect Communities

Communities in Halifax, Nova Scotia
General Service Areas in Nova Scotia